Joseph Gilbert Thorp (April 28, 1812 – January 13, 1895) was a millionaire lumber baron and a member of the Wisconsin State Senate.

Biography
Thorp was born on April 28, 1812, in Butternuts, New York. Later, he moved to Eau Claire, Wisconsin. He died in Cambridge, Massachusetts, in 1895.
The daughter of Joseph G. and Susan Amelia Thorp, Sara Chapman Bull, was married to the world-famous violinist Ole Bull in a lavish wedding in his Madison mansion. His son, Joseph G. Thorp, Jr., was married to a daughter of Henry Wadsworth Longfellow. Thorp, Wisconsin was named after him.

Senate career
Thorp represented the 32nd District of the Senate from 1866 to 1867 and the 30th District from 1872 to 1873. He was a Republican.

References

External links

People from Butternuts, New York
Politicians from Eau Claire, Wisconsin
Republican Party Wisconsin state senators
1812 births
1895 deaths
19th-century American politicians